The Blue Stockings Society, an informal women's social and educational movement in England in the mid-18th century, emphasised education and mutual cooperation. Elizabeth Montagu, Elizabeth Vesey and others founded it in the early 1750s as a literary discussion group, a step away from traditional, non-intellectual women's activities. Both men and women were invited to attend, including the botanist, translator and publisher Benjamin Stillingfleet, who was not rich enough to dress properly for the occasion and appeared in everyday blue worsted stockings. The term "bluestocking" came to refer to the informal quality of the gatherings and the emphasis on conversation rather than on fashion.

History

The Blue Stockings Society of England emerged in about 1750, and waned in popularity at the end of the 18th century. It was a loose organization of privileged women with an interest in education to gather together to discuss literature while inviting educated men to participate. The Blue Stockings Society leaders and hostesses were Elizabeth Montagu and Elizabeth Vesey. The women involved in this group generally had more education and fewer children than most English women of the time. During this time period only men attended universities and women were expected to master skills such as needlework and knitting: It was considered "unbecoming" for them to know Greek or Latin, almost immodest for them to be authors, and certainly indiscreet to admit the fact. Mrs. Barbauld was merely the echo of popular sentiment when she protested that women did not want colleges. "The best way for a woman to acquire knowledge," she wrote, "is from conversation with a father, or brother, or friend." By the early 1800s, this sentiment had changed, and it was more common to question "why a woman of forty should be more ignorant than a boy of twelve," which coincided with the waning of the Blue Stockings' popularity.

The group has been described by many historians and authors such as Jeanine Dobbs as "having preserved and advanced feminism" due to the advocacy of women's education, social complaints of the status and lifestyle expected of the women in their society, seen in the writings of the Blue Stocking women themselves:

The name "Blue Stocking Society" and its origins are highly disputed among historians. There are scattered early references to bluestockings including in the 15th-century Della Calza society in Venice, John Amos Comenius in 1638, and the 17th century Covenanters in Scotland. The society's name perhaps derived from the European fashion in the mid–18th century in which black stockings were worn in formal dress and blue stockings were daytime or more informal wear. Blue stockings were also very fashionable for women in Paris at the time, though many historians claim the term for the society began when Mrs. Vesey first said to Benjamin Stillingfleet, the aforementioned learned gentleman who had given up society and did not have clothes suitable for an evening party, to "Come in your blue stockings". Mr. Stillingfleet became a popular guest at the Blue Stocking Society gatherings.

Purpose
The Blue Stocking society had no membership formalities or fees but was conducted as small to large gatherings in which talk of politics was prohibited but literature and the arts were of main discussion. Learned women with interest in these educational discussions attended as well as invited male guests. Tea, biscuits and other light refreshments would be served to guests by the hostesses.

The New York Times archives contain an article published on 17 April 1881, a century after the events, which describes the Blue Stockings Society as a women's movement combatting the "vice" and "passion" of gambling which was the main form of entertainment at higher society parties. "Instead however, of following the fashion, Mrs. Montagu and a few friends Mrs. Boscawen and Mrs. Vesey, who like herself, were untainted by this wolfish passion, resolved to make a stand against the universal tyranny of a custom which absorbed the life and leisure of the rich to the exclusion of all intellectual enjoyment... and to found a society in which conversation should supersede cards." (1881, The New York Times).

Many of the Blue Stocking women supported each other in intellectual endeavours such as reading, artwork, and writing. Many also published literature. Author Elizabeth Carter (1717–1806) was a Blue Stocking Society advocate and member who published essays and poetry, and translated Epictetus. Contemporary author Anna Miegon compiled biographical sketches of these women in her Biographical Sketches of Principal Bluestocking Women.

Notable members

Modern play
Ladies, a play written by Kit Steinkellner, is a fictional account of four members of the Blue Stockings Society and their impact on modern-day feminism. It received its world première at Boston Court Pasadena in Pasadena, California in June 2019, with direction by Jessica Kubzansky.

References

Further reading
Primary Sources
Kelly, Gary. Bluestocking Feminism: Writings of the Bluestocking Circle, 1738–1790. London: Pickering & Chatto, 1999. 

Studies

Clarke, Norma. The Rise and Fall of the Woman of Letters. London: Pimlico, 2004. 
Eger, Elizabeth. Bluestockings Displayed: Portraiture, Performance and Patronage, 1730–1830. New York: Cambridge University Press, 2013. 
Eger, Elizabeth. Bluestockings: Women of Reason from Enlightenment to Romanticism. Basingstoke: Palgrave Macmillan, 2012.  
Eger, Elizabeth. Brilliant Women: 18th-Century Bluestockings. New Haven, Ct.: Yale University Press, 2008.  
Johns, Alessa. Bluestocking Feminism and British-German Cultural Transfer, 1750–1837. Ann Arbor: The University of Michigan Press, 2014.  
Myers, Sylvia Harcstark. The Bluestocking Circle: Women, Friendship, and the Life of the Mind in Eighteenth-Century England. New York: Oxford University Press, 1990.  
Pohl, Nicole and Betty A. Schellenberg. Reconsidering the Bluestockings. San Marino, Calif.: Huntington Library Press, 2004.  
Tinker, Chauncey Brewster. "The Bluestocking Club." The Salon and English Letters. New York: The MacMillan Company, 1915. 123–183. at Open Library

External links
In Our Time The Bluestockings
Reinventing the Feminine: Bluestocking Women Writers in 18th Century London
Details on origin of term at World Wide Words
Bluestocking Archive
Mrs. Vesey, Cambridge History of English and American Literature
Brilliant Women exhibition at the National Portrait Gallery

18th century in England
1750s establishments in England
Organizations for women writers